.

 
 

The land  first received protected area status in 1970 when the full extent of Katarapko Island received protection under two separate state statutes: one part of the island (i.e. section 73) was declared simultaneously as a fauna conservation reserve and as a game reserve under the Fauna Conservation Act 1964 while the remainder (i.e. section 74) was declared as the Katarapko National Park under the National Park Act 1966.    In 1972, the entire island was declared as a game reserve under the National Parks and Wildlife Act 1972 with the name, the Katarapko Game Reserve.  

In 1984, a draft management plan was offered for public comment.  However, this document did not proceed because of “significant public opposition” to proposals for “roads, a visitor centre and a staff residence” located within the game reserve.  The proposed works were not included in the management plan for the game reserve’s successor, the Murray River National Park, which  published in 1994  for the additional reason of cost due to the “present stringent economic climate.”
 
On 20 June 1991, the game reserve was abolished,  and all of its land holding was constituted under the National Parks and Wildlife Act 1972 as the Murray River National Park. 

In 1980, the game reserve was described as follows:
Katarapko Game Reserve is the largest conservation reserve along the River Murray in South Australia.   It is an important area for the management and conservation of waterfowl, particularly native game species such as ducks.   The reserve is open for a limited duck shooting season and is a popular recreation area, particularly for fishing.

Katarapko Game Reserve is situated on  Katarapko Island  in the River Murray and an adjacent area of river floodplain, opposite the town of Loxton. It has a number of natural backwaters which are lined with very large and attractive red gums.  River box (Eucalyptus largiflorens) woodland and lignum (Muehlenbeckia cunninghamii) low open shrubland occupy low lying areas subject to occasional inundation.  Some horse-shoe lagoons (ox-bow lakes) occur in the central eastern portion of the Island.

A portion is managed as an evaporation basin, which can lead to artificially high water levels and these levels are now controlled, to prevent death of gums by drowning.  Some waterfowl crops have been planted in a small area of the reserve.

In 1980, it was listed on the now-defunct Register of the National Estate.

See also
Protected areas of South Australia

References

Attribution 

Former protected areas of South Australia
Protected areas established in 1970
1970 establishments in Australia
Protected areas disestablished in 1991
1991 disestablishments in Australia
Murray River
Riverland
South Australian places listed on the defunct Register of the National Estate